Nick Phipps (sometimes shown as Nicholas Phipps, born 8 April 1952) is a British bobsledder who competed from 1980 to 1992. He finished third in the Bobsleigh World Cup combined men's event in 1985-86.

Competing in two Winter Olympics, Phipps earned his best finish of 13th both in the two-man and four-man events at Albertville in 1992.

References
 1980 bobsleigh four-man results
 1992 bobsleigh four-man results
 1992 bobsleigh two-man results
 British Olympic Association profile
 List of combined men's bobsleigh World Cup champions: 1985-2007

1952 births
Bobsledders at the 1980 Winter Olympics
Bobsledders at the 1992 Winter Olympics
British male bobsledders
Olympic bobsledders of Great Britain
Living people